Daan Veldhuizen (born 1982), is a Dutch director, editor and cinematographer. He is best known as the director of the critically acclaimed documentaries Stories from Lakka Beach, Banana Pancakes and the Children of Sticky Rice and Laos - Alles hat seinen Preis.

Personal life
He was born in 1982 in Bussum, Netherlands.

Career
He holds a degree in audiovisual arts from the Willem de Kooning Academy in Rotterdam. During his studies, he simultaneously started working in the field as a director, cinematographer and editor. After his initial focus on fiction narratives he eventually directed his attention to documentary filmmaking. 

In 2011, he released his first feature documentary Stories from Lakka Beach about a forgotten beach resort town in war torn Sierra Leone. He produced, directed, filmed and edited the film. The documentary received critical acclaim, was nominated at IDFA for Best Dutch Documentary and was aired nationwide by PBS in the US.

His second documentary Banana Pancakes and the Children of Sticky Rice is set in Laos. The documentary looks at tourism from a cleverly balanced perspective: as backpackers visit a small village in remote northern Laos, the inhabitants of the village discover the attractions of the West. They find themselves on a crossroad of their respective desires. The documentary premiered at IFFR and was theatrically released in The Netherlands, Germany and Switzerland. ARTE broadcast the film under the alternative name Laos, alles hat seinen preis. 

For the acclaimed future affairs series VPRO backlight, he directed the episodes Invasion of the Drones, The End of Cheap Nature, Human in Command and Surviving Chaos.

Filmography

See also
 Luang Prabang Film Festival

References

External links
 

Living people
1982 births
People from Bussum
Dutch film directors
Dutch cinematographers